Lepidoblepharis conolepis is a species of gecko, a lizard in the family Sphaerodactylidae. The species is endemic to Ecuador.

Geographic range
L. conolepis is found in Cotopaxi Province and Pichincha Province, Ecuador, on the western slope of the Andes.

Habitat

Description
The dorsal scales and lateral body scales are conical, to which the specific name refers.

Reproduction
L. conolepis is oviparous.

References

Further reading
Ávila-Pires TCS (2001). "A new species of Lepidoblepharis (Reptilia: Squamata: Gekkonidae) from Ecuador, with a redescription of Lepidoblepharis grandis Miyata, 1985". Occasional Papers of the Sam Noble Oklahoma Museum of Natural History 11: 1–11. (Lepidoblepharis conolepis, new species).

Lepidoblepharis
Reptiles described in 2001
Reptiles of Ecuador
Endemic fauna of Ecuador